No. 458 Squadron RAAF was a Royal Australian Air Force squadron that operated during World War II. It was formed in Australia under Article XV of the Empire Air Training Scheme. The squadron flew various versions of Vickers Wellington bombers, first in Europe and later in the Middle East. It was disbanded in mid-1945, following the conclusion of hostilities in Europe.

History

Over Europe
No. 458 Squadron was formed at Williamtown, New South Wales, on 8 July 1941 as an Article XV squadron under the terms of the Empire Air Training Scheme. Consisting of only ground staff, the squadron departed for the United Kingdom in August to join other personnel assembled at RAF Holme-on-Spalding Moor, where the squadron was officially established as No. 458 (Bomber) Squadron on 25 August 1941. From the outset, the squadron drew personnel from many different countries, with many coming from Britain, Canada and New Zealand, as well as Australia.

Equipped with Wellington Mk.IV bombers, No. 458 Squadron formed part of  No. 1 Group RAF of Bomber Command. It participated in its first operational sortie on 20/21 October, when ten of its aircraft joined in night attacks made against the ports of Emden, Antwerp and Rotterdam. Further attacks were made against industrial targets in France and Germany over the course of several months as part of a strategic bombing campaign. In addition, the Wellingtons were involved in mine-laying operations along enemy occupied coasts. In late 1941, No. 458 Squadron provided a flight to help raise the newly formed No. 460 Squadron RAAF. At the end of January 1942 the squadron was withdrawn from Bomber Command to serve in the Middle East.

Middle East and Mediterranean
The relocation to Middle East Command was, in the words of historian Steve Eather, "chaotic". Air and ground crews were separated as the latter went by sea, while the aircraft were flown out to the Middle East by their crews. While refuelling in Malta, many of the squadron's aircraft were re-allocated to other squadrons, and as a result many crews had to wait in Malta for transport on to Egypt. The move also resulted in the loss of the squadron's commanding officer, who was shot down by German aircraft while en route. It was May by the time that the ground crew reached Egypt, and when they arrived, many were re-allocated to other squadrons, and they too were re-allocated to various units, servicing a variety of aircraft from Royal Air Force and the United States Army Air Forces. Many of the aircrews suffered similarly, being temporarily detached to various squadrons including: Nos. 37, 70, 104, 108, and 148 Squadrons RAF.

On 1 September 1942, the No. 458 Squadron was re-constituted at El Shallufa, in Egypt, and began a new life of maritime patrols, convoy escorts and mine laying operations, once again flying Wellington bombers. In this role, the squadron deployed a number of detachments to various locations around the Middle East. On 30 March 1943, No. 458 Squadron was transferred from El Shallufa to LG. 91, also in Egypt. They continued anti-shipping operations after this and in the middle of 1943 the squadron's crews were responsible for sinking or damaging many ships, including an Italian cruiser and a destroyer. In June, the squadron deployed to Tunisia. This was followed by a further move to Bone, in Algeria, in October 1943, from where further maritime operations were flown, including anti-submarine patrols, which resulted in several attacks. The squadron sank its first U-boat in mid-May, when U-731 was attacked by a Wellington based at Alghero, on Sardinia. In August, the squadron flew bombing missions in support of Operation Dragoon, in southern France. Further moves came in September 1944, with the squadron relocating to Foggia Airfield, in Italy, and deploying detachments to Falconara and Rosignano in Italy and La Vallon, in France.

The squadron's final move came on 26 January 1945 when it was re-established at RAF North Front, Gibraltar. As a result of the Allied liberation of France, and the continued advance of Allied forces in Italy, there were few targets for the squadron in the Mediterranean any more; as a result the squadron was re-tasked to patrol from Gibraltar across the western Atlantic to escort Allied convoys and search for German U-boats. These duties occupied the squadron until the end of the war in May 1945. No. 458 Squadron disbanded shortly thereafter on 9 June 1945 at Gibraltar. Losses during the war amounted to 141 personnel being killed, of whom 65 were Australian.

Aircraft operated
No. 458 Squadron operated the following aircraft:

Squadron bases
No. 458 Squadron operated from the following bases and airfields:

Commanding officers
No. 458 Squadron was commanded by the following officers:

References

Notes

Bibliography

Further reading

External links

 Australian War Memorial: 458 Squadron
 RAAF Museum Point Cook: 458 Squadron

Australian Article XV squadrons of World War II
Military units and formations established in 1941
Military units and formations disestablished in 1945